William Bernard "Bill" Ziff Sr. (August 1, 1898 – December 20, 1953) was an American publishing executive and author.

Biography
Ziff was born on August 1, 1898. He died on December 20, 1953. Ziff and Bernard G. Davis founded the magazine publisher Ziff Davis Inc. during 1927. After his death, in 1953, his son, Bill Ziff Jr., succeeded him at Ziff Davis.

Political views
Being of Jewish ancestry and motivated by the power of Nazi Germany during the 1930s, Ziff became one of the most prominent American endorsers of Revisionist Zionism. During 1935, he was persuaded by devotees of the Revisionist Zionist spokesman Ze'ev Jabotinsky to accept the presidency of the Zionist-Revisionists of America organization although he resigned after one year, being uncomfortable with his role as a Jewish organizational official. Ziff remained active with Zionist politics and caused controversy when he authored during 1938 a criticism of British policy in the Holy Land entitled The Rape of Palestine. The British Foreign Office declared the book "violent and offensive" and monitored Ziff thereafter.

Personal life
On July 25, 1923, he married Denea Fischer (1902–1993); together, they had one daughter and later divorced. Ziff married Amelia Mary Morton (1903–1980) with whom he had three children.

References

1898 births
1953 deaths
American Jews
American magazine founders
William B. Sr.
Businesspeople from New York (state)
American Zionists
20th-century American businesspeople